"When The Day Comes" is a song by Norwegian hip hop duo Nico & Vinz. It was released as the third single from their second studio album Black Star Elephant (2014). It was released as a digital download in Norway on September 30, 2014. The song has peaked at number 9 in Norway.

Music video
A music video to accompany the release of "When The Day Comes" was first released onto YouTube on September 30, 2014 at a total length of six minutes and seven seconds. It was directed by Kavar Singh.

The dramatic video features a Japanese warrior is on a mission to save a young boy from dying.

Track listings

Chart performance
"When The Day Comes" debuted and peaked at #9 in Norway

Weekly charts

Release history

References

2014 songs
2014 singles
Nico & Vinz songs
Songs written by William Wiik Larsen